Sonia Handelman Meyer (February 12, 1920 – September 11, 2022) was an American photographer, best known for her street photography as a member of the New York Photo League.

Early life
Meyer was born in Lakewood Township, New Jersey, in 1920. She was in the first graduating class of Queens College, New York in 1941. She discovered photography in 1942 while she was a civilian worker at Fort Buchanan, Puerto Rico, for the U.S. Army Signal Corps.

Career
Returning to New York in the 1940s, Meyer was a member of the New York Photo League from 1943 to 1951, as a both photographer and secretary. Following World War II, she photographed Jewish Holocaust survivors in New York. She participated in the 1949 exhibition This is the Photo League.

After the dissolution of the Photo League in 1951, Meyer's work went largely unrecognized until 2006 when it was rediscovered by a gallery owner in Charlotte, North Carolina.

In 2014 the Mint Museum in Charlotte presented the exhibition Bearing Witness: The New York Photo League and Sonia Handelman Meyer. In 2019 she was included in the exhibition Modern Women: Modern Vision, Works from the Bank of America Collection at the Tampa Museum of Art.

Personal life and death
Meyer died in Charlotte, North Carolina, on September 11, 2022, at the age of 102.

Collections
Meyer's work is held in the following permanent collections:
 Metropolitan Museum of Art, New York: 1 print (as of December 2019) 
 Jewish Museum, New York: 3 prints (as of December 2019)
 Mint Museum, Charlotte, North Carolina

References

External links

1920 births
2022 deaths
20th-century American photographers
20th-century American women photographers
21st-century American women
Street photographers
Photographers from New Jersey
Queens College, City University of New York alumni
People from Lakewood Township, New Jersey
American centenarians
Women centenarians
United States Army personnel of World War II